Chen Ti and Guillermo Olaso were the defending champions, but Olaso decided not to compete. Chen Ti played alongside Sriram Balaji and lost in the quarterfinals to Gong Maoxin and Peng Hsien-yin.

Sergey Betov and Alexander Bury won the title, defeating Gong Maoxin and Peng Hsien-yin in the final, 7–5, 1–6, [10–6].

Seeds

Draw

Draw

References
 Main Draw

Karshi Challengerandnbsp;- Doubles
2014 Doubles